BoatSetter is an online platform that provides boat rentals. It is based in Fort Lauderdale, Florida. It was founded by Jaclyn Baumgarten.

History
Cruizin was founded in 2012 by Jaclyn Baumgarten.

In 2015 Cruzin was merged with Boatsetter.

In August 2017 Boatsetter acquired its rival boat-sharing platform, Boatbound. Founded in 2013, Boatbound was based in Seattle, Washington. It was often described as Airbnb for boats.

In November 2017 it relocated its headquarters from Aventura to Fort Lauderdale.

In August 2019 Boatsetter received a Series A investment of $10 million. Previously, it raised $13 million in Series A funding in December 2016.

In May 2021 Boatsetter acquired Fisher Guiding.
 
In August 2022 Boatsetter received $38 million in a series B funding.

By 2022 Boatsetter was active in the Caribbean, Europe, Mexico, and the United States.

In January 2023 Michael Farb became the chief executive officer (CEO) of the company, succeeding Jaclyn Baumgarten who was the CEO since 2014.

Platform
Boatsetter is a peer-to-peer boat rental platform. On the platform, boat owners can list their boats for rent. Through Boatsetter Lux Charters, it provides luxury boats and yachts for rent.
 
It has been described as Airbnb for boats. The platform can be assessed through a mobile app. It is available in 600 locations.

See also
 Click and Boat

References

2012 establishments in the United States
Android (operating system) software
IOS software
Sharing economy